The 1992 Cincinnati Bengals season was the team's 25th year in professional football and its 23rd with the National Football League (NFL). They finished the year with five wins and 11 losses, and did not qualify for the playoffs. The Bengals, who were then owned by Mike Brown, the son of coach Paul Brown, now turned to the son of another coach to lead the team on the field when he hired assistant Dave Shula to assume the head coaching reins. The Bengals selected University of Houston quarterback David Klingler in the first round of the 1992 NFL Draft. The younger Shula got off to a good start as the Bengals won their first two games, but then lost its next five games, on the way to a five-win season. Wide receiver Carl Pickens, a second-round selection out of the University of Tennessee, earned Offensive Rookie of the Year honors. Following the season, perennial all-pro offensive tackle Anthony Muñoz retired, as the Bengals moved in a new direction by trading quarterback Boomer Esiason to the New York Jets.

Offseason

NFL Draft

Personnel

Staff

Roster

Regular season

Schedule

Game summaries

Week 3 at Packers

Week 10

Standings

Team leaders

Passing

Rushing

Receiving

Defensive

Kicking and punting

Special teams

Awards and records

All Rookies
David Klingler, QB, PFWA All-Rookie Team
Ricardo McDonald, ILB, PFWA All-Rookie Team
Carl Pickens, WR, PFWA All-Rookie Team

Pro Bowl selections
 Harold Green RB, AFC Pro-Bowl Selection

Milestones
 Harold Green, 1st 1,000-yard season (1,170 yards)

References

External links
 
 1992 Cincinnati Bengals at Pro-Football-Reference.com

Cincinnati Bengals
Cincinnati Bengals seasons
Cincin